Lance David Arnold (born 8 June 1986 in Duisburg) is a German racing driver. He has competed in such series as the Rolex Sports Car Series and Porsche Supercup, as well as the 2009 24 Hours of Nürburgring.

In November 2011, Arnold partnered with 1998 and 1999 F1 World Champion Mika Häkkinen and Cheng Congfu to drive a Mercedes-Benz SLS AMG at the 2011 6 Hours of Zhuhai race, a round of the 2011 Intercontinental Le Mans Cup.

Racing record

Complete Porsche Supercup results
(key) (Races in bold indicate pole position) (Races in italics indicate fastest lap)

‡ Guest Driver — Ineligible for points

Complete 24 Hours of Le Mans results

References

External links
 Official website
 Career statistics from Driver Database

1986 births
Living people
Sportspeople from Duisburg
Racing drivers from North Rhine-Westphalia
German racing drivers
Porsche Supercup drivers
ADAC GT Masters drivers
24 Hours of Spa drivers
International GT Open drivers
24H Series drivers
Formula BMW ADAC drivers
Rolex Sports Car Series drivers
American Le Mans Series drivers
Blancpain Endurance Series drivers
24 Hours of Le Mans drivers
FIA World Endurance Championship drivers

Motopark Academy drivers
Nürburgring 24 Hours drivers
Porsche Motorsports drivers
Rowe Racing drivers
Engstler Motorsport drivers
Porsche Carrera Cup Germany drivers